The 1991–92 NBA season was the Bulls' 26th season in the National Basketball Association. The Bulls entered the season as defending NBA champions, having defeated the Los Angeles Lakers in the 1991 NBA Finals in five games, and winning their first NBA championship in franchise history. The 1991-92 Bulls team are widely regarded as one of the greatest teams of all time. Early into the season, the Bulls traded Dennis Hopson to the Sacramento Kings in exchange for Bob Hansen after the first two games. Coming off their first ever championship, the Bulls had a very successful season winning 14 consecutive games after a 1–2 start to the season. They later on posted a 13-game winning streak in January, which led them to a 37–5 start, and held a 39–9 record at the All-Star break. The Bulls finished in first place in the Central Division, along with having the best record in the league at 67–15.

Michael Jordan captured his second straight Most Valuable Player of the Year award, and sixth straight scoring title, averaging 30.1 points, 6.4 rebounds, 6.1 assists and 2.3 steals per game, while being named to the All-NBA First Team. In addition, Scottie Pippen averaged 21.0 points, 7.7 rebounds, 7.0 assists and 1.9 steals per game, and was selected to the All-NBA Second Team, while Horace Grant provided the team with 14.2 points, 10.0 rebounds and 1.6 blocks per game, and B.J. Armstrong contributed 9.9 points and 3.2 assists per game off the bench. Jordan and Pippen were both named to the NBA All-Defensive First Team, and selected for the 1992 NBA All-Star Game, with head coach Phil Jackson coaching the Eastern Conference. Pippen also finished in ninth place in Most Valuable Player voting, and Jordan and Pippen both finished tied in third place in Defensive Player of the Year voting. Jackson finished in third place in Coach of the Year voting, and three-point specialist Craig Hodges won the Three-Point Shootout for the third consecutive year during the All-Star Weekend in Orlando.

In the Eastern Conference First Round of the playoffs, the Bulls swept the Miami Heat in three straight games after Jordan scored 56 points in a 119–114 road win in Game 3. In the Eastern Conference Semi-finals, they faced the New York Knicks, who were led by Patrick Ewing and coached by Pat Riley. The Bulls would lose Game 1 at home, 94–89, but managed to win the next two games, then take a 3–2 series lead until the Knicks won Game 6 at home, 100–86. The Bulls won Game 7 at home, 110–81 to win the series in seven games. As they advanced to the Eastern Conference Finals, they faced the 3rd-seeded Cleveland Cavaliers. Despite a 26-point home loss in Game 2, 107–81, the Bulls would win the series in six games, and make their second straight trip to the Finals.

In the 1992 NBA Finals, they would go on to beat Clyde Drexler, and the Portland Trail Blazers four games to two to win their second consecutive championship, and second of three straight. Following the season, Hodges and Hansen were both released to free agency.

Draft picks

Roster

Regular season

Season standings

y – clinched division title
x – clinched playoff spot

z – clinched conference
y – clinched division title
x – clinched playoff spot

Record vs. opponents

Game log

Regular season

|-style="background:#cfc;"
| 1
| November 1, 1991
| Philadelphia
| W 110–90
| Michael Jordan (26)
| Scottie Pippen (8)
| John Paxson (9)
| Chicago Stadium18,676
| 1–0
|-style="background:#fcc;"
| 2
| November 2, 1991
| @ Milwaukee
| L 107–109
| Michael Jordan (46)
| Horace Grant (11)
| Paxson & Pippen (5)
| Bradley Center18,633
| 1–1
|-style="background:#fcc;"
| 3
| November 5, 1991
| Golden State
| L 110–118
| Michael Jordan (40)
| Scottie Pippen (11)
| Scottie Pippen (7)
| Chicago Stadium18,136
| 1–2
|-style="background:#cfc;"
| 4
| November 6, 1991
| @ Boston
| W 132–113
| Michael Jordan (44)
| Bill Cartwright (10)
| B. J. Armstrong (9)
| Boston Garden14,890
| 2–2
|-style="background:#cfc;"
| 5
| November 8, 1991
| Dallas
| W 108–92
| Michael Jordan (26)
| Grant & Pippen (10)
| Scottie Pippen (8)
| Chicago Stadium18,120
| 3–2
|-style="background:#cfc;"
| 6
| November 9, 1991
| Orlando
| W 107–76
| Michael Jordan (27)
| Horace Grant (10)
| Michael Jordan (9)
| Chicago Stadium18,131
| 4–2
|-style="background:#cfc;"
| 7
| November 12, 1991
| Detroit
| W 110–93
| Michael Jordan (20)
| Horace Grant (12)
| Scottie Pippen (9)
| Chicago Stadium18,676
| 5–2
|-style="background:#cfc;"
| 8
| November 13, 1991
| @ Charlotte
| W 117–95
| Michael Jordan (35)
| Horace Grant (10)
| Scottie Pippen (9)
| Charlotte Coliseum23,698
| 6–2
|-style="background:#cfc;"
| 9
| November 15, 1991
| Milwaukee
| W 114–101
| Scottie Pippen (23)
| Grant & Levingston (8)
| Michael Jordan (11)
| Chicago Stadium18,686
| 7–2
|-style="background:#cfc;"
| 10
| November 20, 1991
| @ Golden State
| W 112–108
| Michael Jordan (35)
| Horace Grant (14)
| Michael Jordan (7)
| Oakland–Alameda County Coliseum Arena15,025
| 8–2
|-style="background:#cfc;"
| 11
| November 22, 1991
| @ Seattle
| W 112–109 (OT)
| Michael Jordan (31)
| Stacey King (7)
| Scottie Pippen (5)
| Kingdome38,067
| 9–2
|-style="background:#cfc;"
| 12
| November 23, 1991
| @ Denver
| W 107–100
| Michael Jordan (37)
| Stacey King (9)
| Scottie Pippen (5)
| McNichols Sports Arena17,022
| 10–2
|-style="background:#cfc;"
| 13
| November 26, 1991
| @ L.A. Clippers
| W 116–79
| Michael Jordan (23)
| Michael Jordan (10)
| Scottie Pippen (8)
| Los Angeles Memorial Sports Arena15,800
| 11–2
|-style="background:#cfc;"
| 14
| November 29, 1991
| @ Portland
| W 116–114 (2OT)
| Michael Jordan (40)
| Grant & Pippen (11)
| Scottie Pippen (8)
| Memorial Coliseum12,888
| 12–2
|-style="background:#cfc;"
| 15
| November 30, 1991
| @ Sacramento
| W 118–102
| Michael Jordan (30)
| Horace Grant (10)
| Michael Jordan (8)
| ARCO Arena17,014
| 13–2

|-style="background:#cfc;"
| 16
| December 4, 1991
| Cleveland
| W 108–102
| Scottie Pippen (28)
| Scottie Pippen (15)
| Scottie Pippen (10)
| Chicago Stadium18,489
| 14–2
|-style="background:#cfc;"
| 17
| December 6, 1991
| Charlotte
| W 114–96
| Michael Jordan (19)
| Michael Jordan (11)
| Michael Jordan (10)
| Chicago Stadium18,237
| 15–2
|-style="background:#fcc;"
| 18
| December 7, 1991
| @ Philadelphia
| L 100–103
| Michael Jordan (32)
| Michael Jordan (14)
| Michael Jordan (9)
| The Spectrum18,168
| 15–3
|-style="background:#cfc;"
| 19
| December 10, 1991
| Seattle
| W 108–103
| Scottie Pippen (23)
| Horace Grant (13)
| Scottie Pippen (8)
| Chicago Stadium18,061
| 16–3
|-style="background:#cfc;"
| 20
| December 13, 1991
| New York
| W 99–89
| Michael Jordan (27)
| Grant & Jordan (8)
| Jordan & Paxson (6)
| Chicago Stadium18,676
| 17–3
|-style="background:#cfc;"
| 21
| December 14, 1991
| @ Washington
| W 113–100
| Michael Jordan (29)
| Horace Grant (13)
| 3 players tied (3)
| Capital Centre18,756
| 18–3
|-style="background:#fcc;"
| 22
| December 17, 1991
| L.A. Lakers
| L 89–102
| Michael Jordan (21)
| Horace Grant (10)
| Scottie Pippen (8)
| Chicago Stadium18,676
| 18–4
|-style="background:#cfc;"
| 23
| December 20, 1991
| @ New Jersey
| W 115–98
| Horace Grant (28)
| Horace Grant (8)
| B. J. Armstrong (6)
| Brendan Byrne Arena20,049
| 19–4
|-style="background:#cfc;"
| 24
| December 21, 1991
| Atlanta
| W 117–103
| Jordan & Pippen (37)
| Michael Jordan (9)
| Michael Jordan (10)
| Chicago Stadium18,676
| 20–4
|-style="background:#cfc;"
| 25
| December 25, 1991
| Boston
| W 121–99
| Scottie Pippen (27)
| Horace Grant (12)
| Scottie Pippen (8)
| Chicago Stadium18,676
| 21–4
|-style="background:#cfc;"
| 26
| December 26, 1991
| @ Atlanta
| W 122–111
| Michael Jordan (34)
| Horace Grant (18)
| Armstrong & Pippen (7)
| Omni Coliseum16,425
| 22–4
|-style="background:#cfc;"
| 27
| December 28, 1991
| Sacramento
| W 127–118
| Michael Jordan (33)
| Scottie Pippen (12)
| Scottie Pippen (9)
| Chicago Stadium18,676
| 23–4
|-style="background:#cfc;"
| 28
| December 30, 1991
| @ Indiana
| W 109–104
| Michael Jordan (29)
| Horace Grant (10)
| Jordan & Paxson (7)
| Market Square Arena16,530
| 24–4

|-style="background:#fcc;"
| 29
| January 3, 1992
| @ Milwaukee
| L 108–113
| Michael Jordan (44)
| Horace Grant (8)
| Scottie Pippen (8)
| Bradley Center18,633
| 24–5
|-style="background:#cfc;"
| 30
| January 4, 1992
| New Jersey
| W 140–96
| Michael Jordan (27)
| Horace Grant (17)
| Scottie Pippen (9)
| Chicago Stadium18,676
| 25–5
|-style="background:#cfc;"
| 31
| January 7, 1992
| Washington
| W 102–89
| Michael Jordan (21)
| Horace Grant (10)
| Michael Jordan (9)
| Chicago Stadium18,236
| 26–5
|-style="background:#cfc;"
| 32
| January 8, 1992
| @ Miami
| W 108–106
| Michael Jordan (40)
| Horace Grant (10)
| Jordan & Pippen (8)
| Miami Arena15,008
| 27–5
|-style="background:#cfc;"
| 33
| January 10, 1992
| Utah
| W 105–90
| Michael Jordan (37)
| Horace Grant (8)
| Scottie Pippen (6)
| Chicago Stadium18,676
| 28–5
|-style="background:#cfc;"
| 34
| January 11, 1992
| Miami
| W 108–99
| Michael Jordan (30)
| Horace Grant (18)
| Scottie Pippen (8)
| Chicago Stadium18,676
| 29–5
|-style="background:#cfc;"
| 35
| January 14, 1992
| Philadelphia
| W 103–80
| Michael Jordan (26)
| Horace Grant (12)
| Scottie Pippen (7)
| Chicago Stadium18,338
| 30–5
|-style="background:#cfc;"
| 36
| January 16, 1992
| @ Cleveland
| W 100–85
| Michael Jordan (35)
| Horace Grant (12)
| Michael Jordan (8)
| Richfield Coliseum20,273
| 31–5
|-style="background:#cfc;"
| 37
| January 17, 1992
| San Antonio
| W 102–96
| Michael Jordan (31)
| Will Perdue (14)
| Michael Jordan (8)
| Chicago Stadium18,676
| 32–5
|-style="background:#cfc;"
| 38
| January 19, 1992
| @ Detroit
| W 87–85
| Michael Jordan (34)
| Horace Grant (12)
| 3 players tied (6)
| The Palace of Auburn Hills21,454
| 33–5
|-style="background:#cfc;"
| 39
| January 21, 1992
| Phoenix Suns
| W 108–102
| Michael Jordan (30)
| Horace Grant (11)
| Scottie Pippen (6)
| Chicago Stadium18,676
| 34–5
|-style="background:#cfc;"
| 40
| January 22, 1992
| @ Charlotte
| W 115–112
| Michael Jordan (23)
| Bill Cartwright (10)
| Scottie Pippen (8)
| Charlotte Coliseum23,698
| 35–5
|-style="background:#cfc;"
| 41
| January 24, 1992
| Detroit
| W 117–93
| Scottie Pippen (29)
| Stacey King (7)
| Armstrong & Pippen (8)
| Chicago Stadium18,676
| 36–5
|-style="background:#cfc;"
| 42
| January 25, 1992
| Houston
| W 114–100
| Michael Jordan (35)
| Grant & Pippen (9)
| Scottie Pippen (11)
| Chicago Stadium18,676
| 37–5
|-style="background:#fcc;"
| 43
| January 28, 1992
| @ San Antonio
| L 104–109
| Michael Jordan (39)
| Scottie Pippen (10)
| Michael Jordan (7)
| HemisFair Arena16,057
| 37–6
|-style="background:#fcc;"
| 44
| January 30, 1992
| @ Houston
| L 102–105
| Michael Jordan (22)
| Horace Grant (12)
| Horace Grant (6)
| The Summit16,611
| 37–7
|-style="background:#cfc;"
| 45
| January 31, 1992
| @ Dallas
| W 107–92
| Michael Jordan (25)
| Michael Jordan (10)
| Michael Jordan (9)
| Reunion Arena17,502
| 38–7

|-style="background:#cfc;"
| 46
| February 2, 1992
| @ L.A. Lakers
| W 103–97
| Michael Jordan (33)
| Horace Grant (11)
| Michael Jordan (11)
| Great Western Forum17,505
| 39–7
|-style="background:#fcc;"
| 47
| February 3, 1992
| @ Utah
| L 123–126 (3OT)
| Michael Jordan (34)
| 3 players tied (13)
| Michael Jordan (8)
| Delta Center19,911
| 39–8
|-style="background:#fcc;"
| 48
| February 5, 1992
| @ Phoenix
| L 114–126
| Scottie Pippen (26)
| Horace Grant (16)
| Scottie Pippen (12)
| Arizona Veterans Memorial Coliseum14,496
| 39–9
|- align="center"
|colspan="9" bgcolor="#bbcaff"|All-Star Break
|- style="background:#cfc;"
|- bgcolor="#bbffbb"
|-style="background:#cfc;"
| 49
| February 11, 1992
| New Jersey
| W 133–113
| Michael Jordan (34)
| Grant & Pippen (8)
| Scottie Pippen (8)
| Chicago Stadium18,233
| 40–9
|-style="background:#cfc;"
| 50
| February 13, 1992
| @ New York
| W 106–85
| Horace Grant (18)
| Horace Grant (11)
| Scottie Pippen (13)
| Madison Square Garden19,763
| 41–9
|-style="background:#cfc;"
| 51
| February 15, 1992
| New York
| W 99–98
| Michael Jordan (29)
| Horace Grant (11)
| Scottie Pippen (8)
| Chicago Stadium18,676
| 42–9
|-style="background:#fcc;"
| 52
| February 17, 1992
| Cleveland
| L 112–113
| Michael Jordan (46)
| Horace Grant (11)
| Scottie Pippen (7)
| Chicago Stadium18,676
| 42–10
|-style="background:#cfc;"
| 53
| February 19, 1992
| @ Orlando
| W 112–99
| Michael Jordan (46)
| Horace Grant (11)
| Scottie Pippen (7)
| Orlando Arena15,151
| 43–10
|-style="background:#cfc;"
| 54
| February 21, 1992
| @ Atlanta
| W 103–88
| Michael Jordan (33)
| Will Perdue (13)
| Michael Jordan (14)
| Omni Coliseum16,531
| 44–10
|-style="background:#cfc;"
| 55
| February 22, 1992
| Minnesota
| W 105–90
| Michael Jordan (30)
| Horace Grant (17)
| Michael Jordan (8)
| Chicago Stadium18,676
| 45–10
|-style="background:#fcc;"
| 56
| February 25, 1992
| @ Detroit
| L 106–108
| Scottie Pippen (33)
| Horace Grant (13)
| Scottie Pippen (9)
| The Palace of Auburn Hills21,454
| 45–11
|-style="background:#cfc;"
| 57
| February 26, 1992
| Washington Bullets
| W 122–103
| Michael Jordan (26)
| Pippen & Williams (9)
| B. J. Armstrong (7)
| Chicago Stadium18,104
| 46–11
|-style="background:#cfc;"
| 58
| February 28, 1992
| @ Milwaukee
| W 109–105
| Scottie Pippen (41)
| Bill Cartwright (8)
| Michael Jordan (6)
| Bradley Center18,633
| 47–11

|-style="background:#cfc;"
| 59
| March 1, 1992
| Portland
| W 111–91
| Michael Jordan (31)
| Will Perdue (12)
| Scottie Pippen (10)
| Chicago Stadium18,676
| 48–11
|-style="background:#fcc;"
| 60
| March 3, 1992
| Indiana
| L 101–103
| Michael Jordan (27)
| Horace Grant (9)
| Scottie Pippen (9)
| Chicago Stadium18,402
| 48–12
|-style="background:#cfc;"
| 61
| March 5, 1992
| @ Minnesota
| W 113–100
| Michael Jordan (33)
| Will Perdue (11)
| Scottie Pippen (8)
| Target Center19,006
| 49–12
|-style="background:#cfc;"
| 62
| March 6, 1992
| Miami
| W 123–81
| Michael Jordan (27)
| Horace Grant (14)
| Armstrong & Pippen (6)
| Chicago Stadium18,487
| 50–12
|-style="background:#cfc;"
| 63
| March 8, 1992
| @ Philadelphia
| W 103–99
| Michael Jordan (34)
| Michael Jordan (11)
| Michael Jordan (8)
| The Spectrum18,168
| 51–12
|-style="background:#cfc;"
| 64
| March 11, 1992
| Boston
| W 119–85
| Michael Jordan (32)
| Michael Jordan (13)
| Scottie Pippen (11)
| Chicago Stadium18,676
| 52–12
|-style="background:#cfc;"
| 65
| March 14, 1992
| @ Orlando
| W 112–96
| Michael Jordan (26)
| Horace Grant (12)
| Michael Jordan (9)
| Orlando Arena15,151
| 53–12
|-style="background:#cfc;"
| 66
| March 16, 1992
| @ Miami
| W 116–100
| Michael Jordan (37)
| Scottie Pippen (13)
| Michael Jordan (13)
| Miami Arena15,008
| 54–12
|-style="background:#cfc;"
| 67
| March 17, 1992
| @ New Jersey
| W 90–79
| Michael Jordan (40)
| Horace Grant (12)
| Jordan & Pippen (4)
| Brendan Byrne Arena20,049
| 55–12
|-style="background:#cfc;"
| 68
| March 19, 1992
| @ Washington
| W 106–100
| Michael Jordan (51)
| Michael Jordan (11)
| Horace Grant (4)
| Capital Centre18,756
| 56–12
|-style="background:#fcc;"
| 69
| March 21, 1992
| Orlando
| L 108–111
| Scottie Pippen (27)
| Michael Jordan (15)
| John Paxson (6)
| Chicago Stadium18,676
| 56–13
|-style="background:#cfc;"
| 70
| March 24, 1992
| Denver
| W 116–103
| Michael Jordan (50)
| Horace Grant (20)
| Scottie Pippen (13)
| Chicago Stadium18,382
| 57–13
|-style="background:#cfc;"
| 71
| March 28, 1992
| Denver
| W 126–102
| Michael Jordan (44)
| Horace Grant (18)
| B. J. Armstrong (7)
| Chicago Stadium18,676
| 58–13
|-style="background:#cfc;"
| 72
| March 31, 1992
| @ New York
| W 96–90
| Michael Jordan (36)
| Scottie Pippen (18)
| Scottie Pippen (7)
| Madison Square Garden19,763
| 59–13

|-style="background:#cfc;"
| 73
| April 1, 1992
| Charlotte
| W 100–94
| Michael Jordan (31)
| Horace Grant (14)
| Scottie Pippen (12)
| Chicago Stadium18,362
| 60–13
|-style="background:#cfc;"
| 74
| April 3, 1992
| L.A. Clippers
| W 114–103
| Scottie Pippen (24)
| Scottie Pippen (11)
| Jordan & Pippen (7)
| Chicago Stadium18,676
| 61–13
|-style="background:#fcc;"
| 75
| April 5, 1992
| @ Boston
| L 86–97
| Michael Jordan (26)
| Horace Grant (11)
| Grant & Pippen (4)
| Boston Garden14,890
| 61–14
|-style="background:#cfc;"
| 76
| April 7, 1992
| Milwaukee
| W 116–101
| Michael Jordan (30)
| 3 players tied (8)
| Michael Jordan (7)
| Chicago Stadium18,676
| 62–14
|-style="background:#cfc;"
| 77
| April 10, 1992
| @ Indiana
| W 108–96
| Michael Jordan (35)
| Horace Grant (11)
| Michael Jordan (6)
| Market Square Arena16,530
| 63–14
|-style="background:#cfc;"
| 78
| April 11, 1992
| Indiana
| W 108–106
| Michael Jordan (23)
| Horace Grant (7)
| Michael Jordan (8)
| Chicago Stadium18,676
| 64–14
|-style="background:#cfc;"
| 79
| April 13, 1992
| Atlanta
| W 100–93
| Scottie Pippen (16)
| Scott Williams (11)
| Scottie Pippen (8)
| Chicago Stadium18,676
| 65–14
|-style="background:#fcc;"
| 80
| April 14, 1992
| @ Cleveland
| L 100–115
| Scottie Pippen (24)
| Scottie Pippen (10)
| B. J. Armstrong (10)
| Richfield Coliseum20,273
| 65–15
|-style="background:#cfc;"
| 81
| April 17, 1992
| @ Atlanta
| W 121–95
| Michael Jordan (21)
| Scott Williams (7)
| Michael Jordan (8)
| Omni Coliseum16,531
| 66–15
|-style="background:#cfc;"
| 82
| April 19, 1992
| Detroit
| W 103–85
| Michael Jordan (32)
| Scott Williams (16)
| Michael Jordan (7)
| Chicago Stadium18,676
| 67–15

Playoffs

|- align="center" bgcolor="#ccffcc"
| 1
| April 24, 1992
| Miami
| W 113–94
| Michael Jordan (46)
| Michael Jordan (11)
| Scottie Pippen (11)
| Chicago Stadium18,676
| 1–0
|- align="center" bgcolor="#ccffcc"
| 2
| April 26, 1992
| Miami
| W 120–90
| Michael Jordan (33)
| Michael Jordan (13)
| Michael Jordan (6)
| Chicago Stadium18,676
| 2–0
|- align="center" bgcolor="#ccffcc"
| 3
| April 29, 1992
| @ Miami
| W 119–114
| Michael Jordan (56)
| Grant & Pippen (8)
| Jordan & Pippen (5)
| Miami Arena15,008
| 3–0

|- align="center" bgcolor="#ffcccc"
| 1
| May 5, 1992
| New York
| L 89–94
| Michael Jordan (31)
| Cartwright & Pippen (8)
| Scottie Pippen (9)
| Chicago Stadium18,676
| 0–1
|- align="center" bgcolor="#ccffcc"
| 2
| May 7, 1992
| New York
| W 86–78
| Michael Jordan (27)
| Horace Grant (11)
| John Paxson (7)
| Chicago Stadium18,676
| 1–1
|- align="center" bgcolor="#ccffcc"
| 3
| May 9, 1992
| @ New York
| W 94–86
| Michael Jordan (32)
| Horace Grant (13)
| John Paxson (4)
| Madison Square Garden19,763
| 2–1
|- align="center" bgcolor="#ffcccc"
| 4
| May 10, 1992
| @ New York
| L 86–93
| Michael Jordan (29)
| Scottie Pippen (8)
| Scottie Pippen (7)
| Madison Square Garden19,763
| 2–2
|- align="center" bgcolor="#ccffcc"
| 5
| May 12, 1992
| New York
| W 96–88
| Michael Jordan (37)
| Scottie Pippen (10)
| Scottie Pippen (8)
| Chicago Stadium18,676
| 3–2
|- align="center" bgcolor="#ffcccc"
| 6
| May 14, 1992
| @ New York
| L 86–100
| Michael Jordan (21)
| Scottie Pippen (10)
| Michael Jordan (8)
| Madison Square Garden19,763
| 3–3
|- align="center" bgcolor="#ccffcc"
| 7
| May 17, 1992
| New York
| W 110–81
| Michael Jordan (42)
| Scottie Pippen (11)
| Scottie Pippen (11)
| Chicago Stadium18,676
| 4–3

|- align="center" bgcolor="#ccffcc"
| 1
| May 19, 1992
| Cleveland
| W 103–89
| Michael Jordan (33)
| Scottie Pippen (12)
| Scottie Pippen (9)
| Chicago Stadium18,676
| 1–0
|- align="center" bgcolor="#ffcccc"
| 2
| May 21, 1992
| Cleveland
| L 81–107
| Michael Jordan (20)
| Horace Grant (12)
| 4 players tied (3)
| Chicago Stadium18,676
| 1–1
|- align="center" bgcolor="#ccffcc"
| 3
| May 23, 1992
| @ Cleveland
| W 105–96
| Michael Jordan (36)
| Horace Grant (11)
| Michael Jordan (9)
| Richfield Coliseum20,273
| 2–1
|- align="center" bgcolor="#ffcccc"
| 4
| May 25, 1992
| @ Cleveland
| L 85–99
| Michael Jordan (35)
| Horace Grant (15)
| Michael Jordan (6)
| Richfield Coliseum20,273
| 2–2
|- align="center" bgcolor="#ccffcc"
| 5
| May 27, 1992
| Cleveland
| W 112–89
| Michael Jordan (37)
| Scottie Pippen (15)
| Scottie Pippen (6)
| Chicago Stadium18,676
| 3–2
|- align="center" bgcolor="#ccffcc"
| 6
| May 29, 1992
| @ Cleveland
| W 99–94
| Jordan & Pippen (29)
| Scottie Pippen (12)
| Michael Jordan (8)
| Richfield Coliseum20,273
| 4–2

|- align="center" bgcolor="#ccffcc"
| 1
| June 3, 1992
| Portland
| W 122–89
| Michael Jordan (39)
| Pippen & Williams (9)
| Michael Jordan (11)
| Chicago Stadium18,676
| 1–0
|- align="center" bgcolor="#ffcccc"
| 2
| June 5, 1992
| Portland
| L 104–115 (OT)
| Michael Jordan (39)
| Horace Grant (12)
| Jordan & Pippen (10)
| Chicago Stadium18,676
| 1–1
|- align="center" bgcolor="#ccffcc"
| 3
| June 7, 1992
| @ Portland
| W 94–84
| Michael Jordan (26)
| Grant & Pippen (8)
| Scottie Pippen (7)
| Memorial Coliseum12,888
| 2–1
|- align="center" bgcolor="#ffcccc"
| 4
| June 10, 1992
| @ Portland
| L 88–93
| Michael Jordan (32)
| Horace Grant (10)
| Jordan & Pippen (6)
| Memorial Coliseum12,888
| 2–2
|- align="center" bgcolor="#ccffcc"
| 5
| June 12, 1992
| @ Portland
| W 119–106
| Michael Jordan (46)
| Scottie Pippen (11)
| Scottie Pippen (9)
| Memorial Coliseum12,888
| 3–2
|- align="center" bgcolor="#ccffcc"
| 6
| June 14, 1992
| Portland
| W 97–93
| Michael Jordan (33)
| Scott Williams (8)
| Horace Grant (5)
| Chicago Stadium18,678
| 4–2

Player stats

Regular season

Playoffs

Impact of the Stanley Cup Finals

The Chicago Blackhawks were in the Stanley Cup Finals at the same time the Bulls won the NBA championship, but got swept by the defending champions, Pittsburgh Penguins, (It would not be until  when the Blackhawks won their first Stanley Cup since , when they beat the Philadelphia Flyers, in-state rivals of the Penguins, winning in Philadelphia). This was the only year that both the Bulls and the Blackhawks reached their respective league's finals. However, the coach of the Blackhawks, Mike Keenan, would see a concurrent finals series in basketball and hockey taking place in the same city again when he coached the New York Rangers to their first Stanley Cup in 54 years two years later.

Awards and records
 Michael Jordan, Associated Press Athlete of the Year
 Michael Jordan, NBA Most Valuable Player Award
 Michael Jordan, All-NBA First Team
 Scottie Pippen, All-NBA Second Team
 Michael Jordan, NBA Finals Most Valuable Player Award
 Michael Jordan, NBA All-Defensive First Team
 Scottie Pippen, NBA All-Defensive First Team

NBA All-Star Game
 Michael Jordan, Guard
 Scottie Pippen, Forward

Transactions

References

 Bulls on Database Basketball
 Bulls on Basketball Reference

Chicago Bulls seasons
Chicago Bulls
Eastern Conference (NBA) championship seasons
NBA championship seasons
Chicago
Chicago